John Arne Sæterøy (born 16 May 1965), better known by the pen name Jason, is a Norwegian cartoonist, known for his sparse drawing style and silent, anthropomorphic animal characters.

He was nominated for two Ignatz Awards (2000: Outstanding Story and Outstanding Series, 2001: Outstanding Story and Outstanding Series), received praise in Time, and won the Harvey Award for best new talent in 2002, as well as several Eisner Awards.

Biography
Jason was born in Molde, and had his work published for the first time in 1981 in the Norwegian comics magazine KonK, to which he contributed several short stories during its lifespan. In 1989, he was admitted to Norway's National Academy of the Arts, where he studied graphic design and illustration. He won the Norwegian Comics Association award in 1991 for the short work pervo.

In 1995, Jason published his first graphic novel, Lomma full av regn (Pocket Full of Rain), for which he won the Sproing Award. In 1997, he started making Mjau Mjau, a semi-regular comic book featuring nothing but his own works. In 2001, he was once again awarded a Sproing, this time for Mjau Mjau 10. Since 2002, Jason has concentrated on making graphic novels.

Jason has lived in Denmark, Belgium, the U.S., and France. Since 2007, Jason has been living in Montpellier, and his recent graphic novels have been initially published in French.

As Jason's exposure has increased, his comics have been published outside of Norway, in Sweden, Denmark, Finland, France, Germany, Italy, the Netherlands, Poland, Russia, Slovakia, Spain, Switzerland, Brazil,  and the U.S. His American publisher is Fantagraphics.

Style 
Jason's work is usually drawn in a minimalist, clean style, influenced by Hergé's ligne claire. His protagonists are usually anthropomorphic animals and/or B-movie monsters.  There is little or no talking, and very rarely any captions.

Jason's comics frequently refer to other works. For example, Tell Me Something is inspired by Buster Keaton's movies, Frankenstein's Monster and related characters appear in You Can't Get There From Here, and fictionalized versions of Ernest Hemingway and other writers are the protagonists of The Left Bank Gang.

Bibliography of English publications

Awards
 1995: Sproing Award, for Lomma full av regn
 2000: Sproing Award, for Mjau Mjau 10: Si meg en ting
 2000: Urhunden Prize for best translated graphic novel, for Vänta lite...
 2002: Inkpot Award
 2002: Harvey Award, Best New Talent, for Hey, Wait...
 2005: Brage Prize, Open Class for La meg vise deg noe...
 2007: Eisner Award, Best U.S. Edition of International Material, for The Left Bank Gang
 2008: Eisner Award, Best U.S. Edition of International Material, for I Killed Adolf Hitler

References

 Jason publications on Fantagraphics
 Jason publications in French Bedetheque 

Footnotes

External links

 Jason biography on Lambiek Comiclopedia
 "A Life Missed" Time magazine review
 J'ai tué Adolf Hitler preview BDgest 

1965 births
Living people
Norwegian cartoonists
Norwegian comics artists
Norwegian comics writers
Harvey Award winners for Best New Talent
21st-century Norwegian artists
People from Molde